Gastón Etlis and Martín Rodríguez were the defending champions, but did not compete this year.

Jonathan Erlich and Andy Ram won the title, defeating Mariusz Fyrstenberg and Marcin Matkowski 6–3, 6–3 in the final. It was the 9th doubles title for both players in their careers.

Seeds

Draw

Draw

External links
Main Draw

Pilot Pen Tennis
2006 Pilot Pen Tennis